Bampton is a civil parish in the Eden District, Cumbria, England. It contains 33 buildings that are recorded in the National Heritage List for England. Of these, two are listed at Grade II*, the middle grade of the three grades, and the others are at Grade II, the lowest grade.  The parish contains the villages of Bampton and Bampton Grange and smaller settlements, but is mainly rural.  Most of the listed buildings are houses and associated structures, farmhouses and farm buildings in the villages and scattered around the countryside.  The other listed buildings include a former boundary cross, a church, a monument in the churchyard, two bridges, a public house, and a limekiln.


Key

Buildings

Notes and references

Notes

Citations

Sources

Lists of listed buildings in Cumbria
Listed buildings